The 1957 German football championship was the culmination of the football season in the Federal Republic of Germany in 1956–57. Borussia Dortmund were crowned champions for the second time after a group stage and a final. Borussia became the first club since Dresdner SC in 1944 to defend their title won the previous year.

It was Borussia's third appearance in the German final, having lost 3–2 to VfR Mannheim in 1949 and won the championship in 1956, beating Karlsruher SC 4–2. On the strength of this title, the club participated in the 1957–58 European Cup, where it went out to AC Milan in the quarter finals.

For the losing finalist, Hamburger SV, it was its first appearance in the final since winning the title in 1928.

The format used to determine the German champion was different from the 1956 season. Only two clubs took part in the qualifying round, instead of four. The group stage, eight teams split into two groups of four, was conducted as a single round with games on neutral grounds; previously it had been home-and-away games. As in the past seasons, the two group winners then played the national final.

Qualified teams
The clubs qualified through the 1956–57 Oberliga season:

Competition

Qualifying round

Group 1

Group 2

Final

References

Sources
 kicker Allmanach 1990, by kicker, page 164 & 177 – German championship 1957

External links
 German Championship 1956–57 at Weltfussball.de
 Germany – Championship 1957 at RSSSF.com
 German championship 1957 at Fussballdaten.de

1957
1